Froelichia nudicaulis is a species of plant in the family Amaranthaceae. It is endemic to Ecuador.

References

Flora of Ecuador
nudicaulis
Vulnerable plants
Taxonomy articles created by Polbot
Taxa named by Joseph Dalton Hooker